William Beeston was an actor.

William Beeston may also refer to:

William Beeston (colonial administrator)
William Beeston (MP for Newport, Isle of Wight) and for Yarmouth (Isle of Wight) (UK Parliament constituency)